Thomas Augustus Wolstenholme Parker, 6th Earl of Macclesfield (17 March 1811 – 24 July 1896) was a British peer. Before inheriting the earldom, he sat in the House of Commons as Conservative Member of Parliament for Oxfordshire from 1837 until 1841.

Marriage and family
He married Lady Mary Frances Grosvenor (1821–1912), daughter of Richard Grosvenor, 2nd Marquess of Westminster and sister of Hugh Grosvenor, 1st Duke of Westminster.

The couple had fifteen children.

George Augustus Parker (1843-1895) - George Augustus, Viscount Parker, died on 24 September 1895 at age 51. As he predeceased his father, the earldom passed to his eldest son George Loveden (1888–1975).
Cecil Thomas Parker (1845-1931) - Hon. Cecil Thomas Parker, who married Rosamond Esther Harriet Longley (c. 1844-1936), daughter of Charles Thomas Longley, Archbishop of Canterbury. Hon. Cecil Parker was the brother-in-law of Major Edward Levett of Rowsley, Derbyshire, whose first wife was Caroline Georgina Longley, also a daughter of Archbishop Longley. When Edward Levett died in Pau, France, in December 1899, he named his former brother-in-law Parker as his executor. His great-great-grandson is Andrew Parker Bowles.
Elizabeth Amelia Parker (1846-1916)
Adelaide Helen Parker (1848-1941)
Algernon Robert Parker (1849-1940) - served as rector of Bix in Oxfordshire and Malpas in Cheshire
Francis Parker (1851-1931) - served as MP for Henley.
Sidney Parker (1852-1897) - an early rugby union international who represented England in 1874 and 1875.
Reginald Parker (1854-1942)
Hugh Lupus Parker (1855-1859)
Edmund William Parker (1857-1943)
Archibald Parker (1859-1931) - served as rector of Wem in Shropshire.
Henry Parker (1860-1952)
Mary Alice Parker (1863-1930)
Alexander Edward Parker (1864-1958)
Evelyn Florence Parker (1867-1957)

The 6th Earl died at the age of 85.

Notes

References

External links
 

|-

1811 births
1896 deaths
Thomas
Conservative Party (UK) MPs for English constituencies
Earls in the Peerage of Great Britain
UK MPs 1837–1841
UK MPs who inherited peerages
Parker, Thomas
Earls of Macclesfield